Prince Peter Petrovich Dolgorukov (Russian: Князь Пётр Петрович Долгоруков; 1744–1815) was a Russian infantry general. He served as governor of Kaluga and Moscow and commanded the Tula Arms Plant. He was the aide-de-camp of Alexander I as a young soldier. His three sons Vladimir, Peter and Mikhail were also all generals

References

1744 births
1815 deaths
Peter
People of the Russo-Turkish War (1768–1774)
Imperial Russian Army generals